Vasil Vetsev (born 21 January 1974) is a Bulgarian gymnast. He competed at the 1996 Summer Olympics and the 2000 Summer Olympics.

References

1974 births
Living people
Bulgarian male artistic gymnasts
Olympic gymnasts of Bulgaria
Gymnasts at the 1996 Summer Olympics
Gymnasts at the 2000 Summer Olympics
Gymnasts from Sofia